Gasimov, Qasimov or Kasumov is an Azerbaijani male surname, its feminine counterpart is Gasimova, Qasimova or Kasumova. It may refer to
Alim Qasimov (born 1957), Azerbaijani singer and musician
Eldar Gasimov (born 1989), Azerbaijani singer also known as Ell, winner of Eurovision Song Contest 2011 as part of duo Ell & Nikki
Elmar Gasimov (born 1988), Azerbaijani judoka
Farghana Qasimova (born 1979), Azerbaijani singer
Faig Gasimov (1974–2020), Azerbaijani lieutenant colonel
Fidan Gasimova (born 1947), Azerbaijani operatic soprano 
Jabbar Gasimov (1935–2002), Azerbaijani poster artist
Kifayat Gasimova (born 1983), Azerbaijani judoka
Khuraman Gasimova, Azerbaijani opera singer and actress 
Ilhama Gasimova (born 1976), Azerbaijani pop singer
Mir Bashir Gasimov (1879–1949), Azerbaijani statesman and revolutionary
Mirabbas Gasimov (1939–2008), Azerbaijani mathematician
Natavan Gasimova (born 1985), Azerbaijani volleyball player 
Ramil Gasimov (born 1980), Azerbaijani judoka
Rena Gasimova (born 1961), Azerbaijani computer scientist
Ruslan Gasimov (born 1979), Azerbaijani-Russian judoka 
Tofig Gasimov (born 1938), Azerbaijani politician and diplomat
Vali Gasimov (born 1968), Azerbaijani football player

See also
Gashimov

Azerbaijani-language surnames